A list of films produced by the Marathi language film industry based in Maharashtra in the year 1945.

1945 Releases
A list of Marathi films released in 1945.

References

Lists of 1945 films by country or language
1945
1945 in Indian cinema